"Fantastic" is the sixth single released by Japanese singer Ami Suzuki under Avex Trax released on 8 February 2006, in three formats, the two traditional CD and CD+DVD edition versions with the B-side track, and a Limited Edition version without the B-side track.

Information
"Fantastic" is a trance-like song with a J-pop essence. The B-side, "Slow Motion", is a soft ballad tune.

"Fantastic" was used as the opening for the anime television series Blackjack, being the first song by Suzuki which appeared on an anime. Taking this step in her career, Avex expected to get more attention to Suzuki by anime fans, and so did Suzuki herself, and even more after the decrease of her single sales. In the interview at Oricon Style, Suzuki said she hoped the song will have more success because the anime fans.

The single was Suzuki's biggest success in six months. It did well on the charts, debuting at number nine in its first day, but then it fell off the charts in a few days. Although "Fantastic" debuted with her highest sales since "Negaigoto", it still wasn't as successful as "Delightful" and "Eventful".

Track listing

Personnel
 Ami Suzuki - vocals, backing vocals
 Hidetake Yamamoto - acoustic guitar (#2)

Production
 Producer - Max Matsuura
 Mixing - Naoki Yamada (#1), Yasuo Matsumoto (#2)

Live performances
3 February 2006 — Music Fighter
9 February 2006 — Utaban
10 February 2006 — PopJam
18 February 2006 — Melodix

Charts
Oricon Sales Chart (Japan)

See also
Fantastic Ami Interview at Oricon (In Japanese)
Fantastic Information at Oricon

2006 singles
Ami Suzuki songs
Songs written by Ami Suzuki
2006 songs
Avex Trax singles
Song recordings produced by Max Matsuura